Buddha Lama (born November 23, 1997) is Nepalese singer, actor, dancer and model who rose to fame after winning the title and becoming the first winner of Nepalese TV series Nepal Idol. Since winning Nepal Idol, he has become a teen idol. Lama holds the title for Nepal Idol winner for the season one with Nishan Bhattarai as runner up and Partap Das as second runner up. Buddha Lama is runner-up of Nepal’s first session of Dancing with the stars. ' Career 

 Nepal Idol success 
Lama participated in Nepalese reality television show Nepal Idol and he managed to win the show with the prize of Pranish, 20  Lakhs NPR, album and contract worth of 15  Lakhs. After winning Nepal Idol, he went to the Nepal Idol Worldwide Tour with Nishan Bhattarai and Pratap Das. He was also in limelight due to his row with the organizers regarding the prize money.

 Filmography 
 Nepal Idol'' as Participant Buddha Lama
 "Saani"( Music Video ) Debut as Singer/Model
 He is also participating in dancing reality show Dancing with the Stars Nepal which is coming soon on Himalaya TV HD

Tours 
 Nepal Idol Worldwide Tour (2017–2018)

References

External links 

Living people
21st-century Nepalese male singers
Nepalese businesspeople
Nepalese songwriters
1997 births
Nepalese folk musicians
People from Pokhara
Nepal Idol winners
Tamang people